A Beautiful Storm is a composition by Jennifer Thomas from her debut album Key of Sea (re-released as a special 10th edition in 2017) which was used during 2018 in the ISU Grand Prix of Figure Skating gold medal winning programmes by Rika Kihira from Japan.

Following this a partnership was established with the major Japanese Avex Entertainment group to promote the song and her album "Key of Sea 10th edition".

Reviews 
 Mormon Music 
 Mainly Piano

Albums
 The Fire Within (2018)
 Key of Sea (10 Year Special Edition) (2017) 
 Winter Symphony (2015)
 Illumination (2012)
 The Lullaby Album, Vols 1 & 2 (2009)
 Key of Sea (2007)

References

Piano compositions by American composers
2018 in figure skating
2017 compositions